On The False Earths is volume seven in the French comic book (or bande dessinée) science fiction series Valérian and Laureline created by writer Pierre Christin and artist Jean-Claude Mézières.

Synopsis
India, the nineteenth century. British forces from the East India Company are attacking a fort. Among them is Valérian, who suddenly breaks from the pack, to the surprise of his compatriots who warn that his actions are "not part of the program". Deep inside the fort, he follows the Maharajah who activates an alien communications device and transmits a message that there is an external influence at work. The unknown person at the other end responds that the program is to be modified. Valérian knocks out the Maharajah and his guards and forwards the co-ordinates the transmission is coming from to Laureline. Pursued by both the British soldiers and the Indians, he is cornered on the ramparts of the fort. Shot, he plunges into the moat but there is no bottom and falls straight through the water into open space.

On the astroship, Laureline looks on in horror as Valérian dies. She tells her companion, Jadna, that she'll never get used to this. Jadna, a historian, is completely unruffled by the turn of events and orders Laureline to prepare for the next incursion.

London, England. Valérian, dressed as a nineteenth-century gentleman, waits on a deserted street corner. Slowly, the streets fill up. One person in particular attracts Valérian's attention, getting out of a carriage. His name is Sir Percy. Valérian drags him into an alley. Sir Percy complains that this is not part of the program before Valérian knocks him out. Posing as Sir Percy, Valérian enters a gentleman's club. Searching the club for his objective, he comes upon a private room where he is expected. At the head of the table is the prime minister, William Ewart Gladstone and surrounding him are his cabinet. Before Valérian can do anything else, one of the club's servants enters to warn them that their visitor is not part of the program. Valérian draws his gun but is happy to let Gladstone activate another one of the alien communications devices, this time concealed in an ornate clock. While Valérian gathers a new set of co-ordinates, the device responds with new orders and he is attacked. He flees the club on a bicycle and is soon pursued not only by the members of the club but also all the bystanders on the street. He cycles clear of the crowd but suddenly finds he has run out of land and cycles over the edge into space.

Laureline is upset at seeing Valérian die once more. But, again, Jadna orders her to get ready for the next intervention.

San Francisco, Chinatown, 1895. Valérian is walking through the streets. He is suddenly surprised to see a man driving past in a Harley Davidson – a blatant anachronism. He continues on his way to the docks where he observes a group of men entering a building for a meeting. Laureline and Jadna are watching what's happening from the astroship. He enters the building, finds the communications device and transmits the co-ordinates. The device orders immediate destruction of the exterior menace. Valérian retreats but is shot and falls to the ground outside the building. Laureline's view is restricted and she switches to the observation satellite – we can see that "San Francisco" is floating in space like an island, surrounded by a force-field to keep the atmosphere in. Zooming in, Laureline sees the men catch up to Valérian and kill him. Jadna observes that each new location moves them to a recreation of a point slightly further on in time and estimates that the next location will be near the beginning of the twentieth century. She asks Laureline to prepare another one.

A launch leaves the astroship and flies to another of these strange islands in space – this time a recreation of Paris. The launch opens and Valérian emerges and walks into town. There are more anachronisms – a pinball machine in a café and a thug with a Tommy gun who shoots Valérian dead.

Back on the astroship, Laureline and Jadna watch this and realise that their adversary has caught on to their activities. Another Valérian must be dispatched. Entering the cargo bay, there are hundreds of capsules, each containing a Valérian clone in suspended animation. At the top of the bay lies the real Valérian, also in suspended animation. Reviving the next Valérian, number 210, Laureline has to explain to it that it isn't the real Valérian and that it has only a lifespan of three hours. They have been made so that Laureline and Jadna can complete their mission. The latest Valérian is given psychological conditioning to prepare him for his mission and is then sent in a launch to the recreation of Paris. This time he's ready for the man with the machine gun and kills him before leaping into a car where the communications device is located under the dashboard. Valérian gets the co-ordinates before the driver swerves the car off the edge and out into space.

Jadna is sure that this set of co-ordinates will lead to their, still unknown, adversary. Laureline makes the spatio-temporal jump and they materialise amid a collection of recreations of monuments from Earth, including the pyramids, the Vatican and the Blue Mosque. The astroship crashed to the ground amid a recreation of one of the battles of the First World War. Laureline is knocked unconscious. French troops attack the astroship. Jadna goes to the cargo bay and revives all the Valérian clones as well as the original Valérian, puts them in German uniform and sends them out to fight. The real Valérian is exhausted due to loss of the blood he had to give to make all the clones and, while the others go over the top, he heads off in search of someplace to sleep. Jadna goes back to check on Laureline but is communicated with telepathically by the alien creator of all these artificial Earths who invites her to join him.

Using a jet pack Jadna crosses the battlefield to the alien's ship where she is, at last, greeted by her quarry. The Alien explains that it comes from a planet that has no history and whose society has remained unchanged since the beginning of time. Accordingly, he has been fascinated by the Earth's rich history. Initially, he tried to visit the Earth's past but was driven away by the Spatio-Temporal Service who feared he was trying to upset the timeline. Instead, he decided to make recreations of various key moments in Earth's history to improve his understanding. He shows Jadna his vast library of books, films and photographs all from Earth as well as his machines for creating each artificial Earth and the androids who populate it. Jadna explains that she was sent, along with Valérian and Laureline, to determine whether these were being used to plan an invasion of Earth. The Alien tells her that his ship has run out of power and that he is at her mercy. He offers to show her more of his collection of documents.

Regaining consciousness, Laureline is horrified to discover that the real Valérian has gone and the clones with him. Leaving the ship, she is faced with a vista of devastation – the corpses of the Valérian clones piled high on the battlefield around her. Searching the corpses to see if the real Valérian is among them, she is close to despair when she finds the real Valérian alive and well asleep in a bombed out house. They head for the Alien's ship where they find the Alien and Jadna deep in conversation. Laureline demands that their astroship be released. Jadna accuses Laureline of being uncouth. Laureline retorts that all the periods of history the Alien examined showed Earth's past at its worst – a past that will eventually lead to the events of 1986 seen in The City of Shifting Waters.

Leaving Jadna with the Alien and telling her that she can call Galaxity when she's ready to return, Laureline and Valérian take off in the astroship. Valérian is still in need of recuperation, and Laureline decides to take him to the real 1881 for a holiday.

Main characters
 Valérian, a spatio-temporal agent from Galaxity, future capital of Earth, in the twenty-eighth century
 Laureline, originally from France in the eleventh century, now a spatio-temporal agent of Galaxity in the twenty-eighth century
 Jadna, a specialist historian from Galaxity
 The Alien, mysterious creator of the artificial Earths.

Setting
 Various unspecified locations in space in which the Alien has constructed his dioramas of Earth history. Simulations visited include:
 Sittanavasal, India, near Trichy in the state of Tamil Nadu. It is best known as the site of an ancient Jain monastery.
 London, England, Pall Mall. The club that Valérian enters is the Athenæum Club at 107, Pall Mall. It's rather surprising that Valérian finds Gladstone there – as a member of the Liberal Party, he would more likely be found in either the Reform Club or the National Liberal Club.
 San Francisco, California, USA, Chinatown, 1895.
 Paris, France during the Belle Epoque of the late nineteenth century, till World War I. 
 World War I, an unspecified battle involving trench warfare, in France.
 We also see various other simulations created by the alien including: the Vatican City, the Forum, the Sphinx, the Pyramids, the Blue Mosque and the statues at Easter Island.
 In addition, the Alien tells Jadna that he has constructed some ancient cities near Denebola in the Constellation of Leo and a Chinese period near Zuben-Al-Akrab which is in the Constellation of Libra.
 Earth, 1881, Maison Fournaise, Chatou, France where Laureline takes Valérian to recuperate after their ordeal.

Notes
 Board 12, panel 2 of this album contains a cameo appearance by Edgar P. Jacobs' comic book heroes Blake and Mortimer – they can be seen to the right of the panel, reading newspapers, as Valérian enters the bar of the Athenæum Club.
 The very last panel of this album (board 46, panel 5), depicting Valérian and Laureline enjoying a meal, is a homage to the 1881 painting Luncheon of the Boating Party by Pierre-Auguste Renoir .
 Various concepts in this album have appeared in other, earlier works of science-fiction. The notion of parts of the Earth being lifted and set adrift between the stars has appeared in James Blish's City In Flight series written between 1957 and 1959. Other concepts – artificial worlds, the gradual breakdown of reality and the notion that the Valérian clones don't realise they are copies – crop up frequently in the writings of Philip K. Dick whose fiction regularly touches on the theme of “What is real?” and “What is human?”

1977 graphic novels
Valérian and Laureline